The Canton of Florensac is a former subdivision of the French department of Hérault, and its subdivision, the Arrondissement of Béziers. It had 9,707 inhabitants (2012). It was disbanded following the French canton reorganisation which came into effect in March 2015. It consisted of 4 communes, which joined the canton of Pézenas in 2015.

Composition
The canton comprised the following communes:
 Castelnau-de-Guers
 Florensac
 Pinet
 Pomérols

References

Florensac
2015 disestablishments in France
States and territories disestablished in 2015